Cyperus procerus is a species of sedge that is native to parts of Africa, Asia and Australia.

The species was first formally described by the botanist Christen Friis Rottbøll in 1773.

See also 
 List of Cyperus species

References 

procerus
Taxa named by Christen Friis Rottbøll
Plants described in 1773
Flora of Assam (region)
Flora of the Andaman Islands
Flora of Bangladesh
Flora of Burkina Faso
Flora of Borneo
Flora of China
Flora of Cameroon
Flora of Cambodia
Flora of Egypt
Flora of Chad
Flora of Ethiopia
Flora of Ghana
Flora of Queensland
Flora of the Northern Territory
Flora of New South Wales
Flora of Ivory Coast
Flora of India
Flora of Kenya
Flora of Laos
Flora of Madagascar
Flora of Malawi
Flora of Malaysia
Flora of Namibia
Flora of Mali
Flora of Niger
Flora of Nepal
Flora of Nigeria
Flora of the Philippines
Flora of Somalia
Flora of Sudan
Flora of Sri Lanka
Flora of Thailand
Flora of Tanzania
Flora of Togo
Flora of Vietnam
Flora of Zimbabwe
Flora of Zambia